Go Gang ("đảo Gò Găng") is an island that is part of Bà Rịa–Vũng Tàu province, Vietnam

Geography
Go Gang Island is located in the Long Son commune of Vung Tau and is about 3 km southwest of the city center of Vung Tau. The 30km2 island borders rivers on three sides and the sea on another.  Surrounded by tributaries of the Mekong Delta and Dinh River, its topography includes also a system of forests, ponds, and lakes. On the west, it neighbors Long Sơn Island, with the two islands connected by Chà Và Bridge.  It is connected to Vung Tau city on the East through Gò Găng Bridge.

Development
Historically, Go Gang has been a relatively deserted island featuring minimal infrastructure, with a boat required to travel to the island and no connections to municipal water or electricity. By 2005, the Go Gang bridge projects began to stimulate economic development and investment.  With the construction of Go Gang Bridge connecting into National Highway 51, living and conducting business on the island became a more viable prospect.  Wind power stations were introduced in September 2011 to alleviate poverty.  In 2015, re-zoning plans were reviewed for the island to assess whether lang development would be possible without deeply damaging the island's natural habitat. 

In 2020, officials of the Bà Rịa–Vũng Tàu province established their intent towards making the island its centerpiece for a new economic zone that would emphasize sustainable development by zoning 57% of the island for urban construction.  This would include housing, shopping complexes, a local fishing center, and other infrastructure. The plan would also have housing for 65,000 residents on the island.

Go Gang Airport
In 2020, official plans were announced for a new Go Gang airport covering 248.5 hectacres southwest of Gành Rái Bay and northwest of the Chà Và River.  Its aim is to replace the Vũng Tàu Airport in order to increase capacity for travel and tourism. A site has been approved for the construction of the airport.

References

Districts of Bà Rịa-Vũng Tàu province
Bà Rịa-Vũng Tàu province
Landforms of Bà Rịa-Vũng Tàu province